The Fish Anthology is a yearly short story anthology based in Ireland published by Fish Publishing that collects the best short fiction published annually in the United States, United Kingdom, Ireland, Canada and other English-speaking nations. The volume was first published in 1994 by Clem Cairns and Jula Walton. It is widely regarded as the leading short story annual in Ireland.

Roddy Doyle is a long-time sponsor of the anthology. Dermot Healy and Frank McCourt were past sponsors.

Notable contributors

Kathleen Murray
Jacob M. Appel
Catherine Phil MacCarthy

Ted Sheehy
Courtney Zoffness
Ronan Bennett

References

External links
Fish Anthology homepage

Fiction anthologies
Book series introduced in 1993
Anthology series